Archibald Campbell (2 January 1874 – 1 September 1955) was a New Zealand politician of the Labour Party and Secretary of the Port Chalmers Waterside Workers Union.

Political career

His brother had already won the nomination as the Labour candidate for the  against Michael Connelly, when he died in February 1935 following an operation. The Labour Party hierarchy wanted to make Connolly their candidate, but there was resentment and a new ballot was held, which was won by Archibald Campbell. He was elected for the Chalmers electorate with the swing to Labour in the 1935 election, but retired in 1938.

He served on the Legislative Council from 1939 to 1946 and from 1947 to 1950, when the upper house was abolished.

Notes

References

1874 births
1955 deaths
New Zealand Labour Party MPs
Members of the New Zealand Legislative Council
New Zealand Labour Party MLCs
New Zealand MPs for Dunedin electorates
Members of the New Zealand House of Representatives